Moqri Kola (also Romanized as Moqrī Kolā, Maqrī Kalā, and Moqrī Kalā; also known as Mokrī Kolā) is a village in Khvosh Rud Rural District, Bandpey-ye Gharbi District, Babol County, Mazandaran Province, Iran. At the 2006 census, its population was 385, in 94 families.

References 

Populated places in Babol County